Vakkantham Suryanarayana Rao is an Indian Telugu language author. He wrote several short stories and serialised novels for magazines and translated spiritual texts for the Tirupati Tirumala Devasthanam and had friends among literary circles. His son Vakkantham Vamsi is a screenwriter in Telugu films.

See also
 List of Indian writers

References

External links
 
 
 
 
 
 
 

Indian male writers
Telugu-language writers
People from Chittoor district
Writers from Andhra Pradesh